is a 2012 Japanese drama film directed by Tokiyuki Takimoto based on the story of the Hayabusa asteroid probe, which collected samples from the asteroid Itokawa in 2005 and returned them to Earth in 2010.

Two other films made on the same subject were Hayabusa (2011) and Welcome Home, Hayabusa (2012). Hayabusa: The Long Voyage Home emphasized the role of the people on the ground as they helped return the probe.

Cast
Ken Watanabe
Yōsuke Eguchi
Yui Natsukawa
Yukiyoshi Ozawa
Ricco Ross
Tatsuya Fuji
Tsutomu Yamazaki

See also
Hayabusa spacecraft

References

External links
Archive copy of the official website

2012 drama films
2012 films
Japanese drama films
Films about space programs
Films scored by Kousuke Yamashita
2010s Japanese films
2010s Japanese-language films